A false equivalence or false equivalency is an informal fallacy in which an equivalence is drawn between two subjects based on flawed or false reasoning. This fallacy is categorized as a fallacy of inconsistency. Colloquially, a false equivalence is often called "comparing apples and oranges."

Characteristics 
This fallacy is committed when one shared trait between two subjects is assumed to show equivalence, especially in order of magnitude, when equivalence is not necessarily the logical result. False equivalence is a common result when an anecdotal similarity is pointed out as equal, but the claim of equivalence does not bear scrutiny because the similarity is based on oversimplification or ignorance of additional factors. The pattern of the fallacy is often as such:

Example:

Examples 

The following statements are examples of false equivalence:

 "The Deepwater Horizon oil spill is no more harmful than when your neighbor drips some oil on the ground when changing his car's oil."
The "false equivalence" is the comparison between things differing by many orders of magnitude: Deepwater Horizon spilled  of oil; one's neighbor might spill perhaps .
 "They are both Felidae, mammals in the order Carnivora, therefore there's little difference between having a pet cat and a pet jaguar."
The "false equivalence" is in an oversimplification of the factors that make an animal a suitable pet.
 "Consuming marijuana can lead to consuming and acquiring a psychological dependence on heroin later in life by acting as a gateway drug, so taking marijuana is like taking heroin."
The "false equivalence" is not considering the difference in likelihood. Consuming heroin is more likely to lead to future heroin dependence than taking marijuana, even given the assumption that one who begins using marijuana is more likely at some later time to try heroin, than someone who has never used marijuana.
They are both Equidae, mammals in the order Perissodactyla, therefore there's little difference between riding a horse and riding a zebra. 

The "false equivalence" is in an oversimplification of the factors that make an animal a suitable one to be ridden.

Negative causes 
False equivalence arguments are often used in journalism and in politics, where flaws of one politician may be compared to flaws of a wholly different nature of another.

Thomas Patterson of the Shorenstein Center on Media, Politics and Public Policy at Harvard University wrote about the false equivalency used by the media during the 2016 United States presidential election:

See also 

 Affirming the consequent
 Apophenia
 Equivocation
 False balance
 False analogy
 List of fallacies
 Tu quoque
 Whataboutism
 Wronger than wrong

References

Further reading

External links 
 
 

Informal fallacies
Fallacies